Tikhonov is a rural locality (a khutor) in Dukmasovskoye Rural Settlement of Shovgenovsky District, the Republic of Adygea, Russia. The population was 375 as of 2018. There are 6 streets.

Geography 
Tikhonov is located 31 km west of Khakurinokhabl (the district's administrative centre) by road. Chikalov is the nearest rural locality.

References 

Rural localities in Shovgenovsky District